Brushfire! is a 1962 low budget black-and-white jungle warfare adventure exploitation film produced, directed and co-written by Jack Warner, Jr the only son of Jack L. Warner of Warner Bros. Warner planned on making two more films under his Obelisk Productions company but they were never produced. It was filmed at the time of the beginning of American involvement in Viet Nam and Laos brushfire conflicts.

Plot
Two American World War II veterans Jeff (John Ireland) and Chevern (Everett Sloane) reside as planters in an unnamed Southeast Asian nation.  They are drawn into a conflict with a group of guerrillas led by Martin (Carl Esmond) and Vlad (Howard Caine) who have abducted a young American couple Tony (Al Avalon) and Easter (Jo Morrow) Banford.   The two use their jungle fighting expertise and knowledge of the local land to rescue them and wipe out the guerrillas. Jeff states that the rescue effort was worth the high cost in lives because it kept an uprising from developing into a rebellion.

Cast
 John Ireland as Jeff
 Everett Sloane as Chevern
 Carl Esmond as Martin
 Howard Caine as Vlad
 Al Avalon as Tony
 Jo Morrow as Easter
Maria Tsien as Lin Chan

References

External links

1962 films
Vietnam War films
American war films
American black-and-white films
Paramount Pictures films
1962 adventure films
1962 directorial debut films
1960s English-language films
1960s American films